Masahiko Tanaka (田中 雅彦, born January 9, 1982, in Tondabayashi, Osaka) is a Japanese former professional baseball catcher in Japan's Nippon Professional Baseball. He played with the Chiba Lotte Marines from 2007 to 2012 and the Tokyo Yakult Swallows in 2013 and 2015.

External links

1982 births
Living people
Baseball people from Osaka Prefecture
Japanese baseball players
Nippon Professional Baseball catchers
Chiba Lotte Marines players
Tokyo Yakult Swallows players
People from Tondabayashi, Osaka
Japanese baseball coaches
Nippon Professional Baseball coaches